Air Chief Marshal Sir Anthony John Crowther "Tony" Bagnall,  (born 8 June 1945) is a retired senior Royal Air Force officer and former Vice-Chief of the Defence Staff.

Flying career
Bagnall was commissioned into the Royal Air Force in 1967. He became a weapons instructor on the English Electric Lightning fighter aircraft later that year. Bagnall became Commanding Officer of No. 43 Squadron flying the  McDonnell Douglas Phantom FG.1, and then No. 23 Squadron in the Falkland Islands in 1983 before becoming Director of Air Staff Briefing and Co-ordination in 1985 and then Station Commander of RAF Leuchars in Fife in 1988. Promoted to air commodore in 1990, he was made Director of Air Force Staff Duties at the Ministry of Defence in 1991. Promoted again, this time to air vice marshal, in 1992 he was appointed Assistant Chief of the Air Staff and then in 1994 went on to become Air Officer Commanding No. 11 Group. This was followed by a tour starting in 1996 as Deputy Commander-in-Chief, Allied Forces Central Europe in the rank of Air Marshal.

In 1998 he became Air Member for Personnel and Air Officer Commanding-in-Chief, Personnel and Training Command before being appointed Commander-in-Chief Strike Command in 2000. He served as Vice-Chief of the Defence Staff from 2001 until his retirement in 2005.

In 2005 he became a member of the Court of the University of St Andrews.

Family
He is married to Pamela; they have three children.

References

|-

|-

|-

|-

|-

|-

1945 births
Fellows of the Royal Aeronautical Society
Knights Commander of the Order of the Bath
Knights Grand Cross of the Order of the British Empire
Living people
Royal Air Force air marshals
Graduates of the Royal Air Force College Cranwell